Animal Welfare is a quarterly, peer-reviewed scientific journal covering studies on the welfare of animals, whether in captivity (e.g. on farms, in laboratories, zoos and as companions) or in the wild. Its scope includes animal welfare science, animal cognition, ethology, behavioural ecology, evolution of behaviour, sociobiology, behavioural physiology, population biology, neurophysiology and abnormal behaviour. It was established in 1992 and is published by the Universities Federation for Animal Welfare. The editor-in-chief is James K. Kirkwood (Universities Federation for Animal Welfare).

Abstracting and indexing 

The journal is abstracted and indexed in:

According to the Journal Citation Reports, the journal has a 2012 impact factor of 1.433.

References

External links 

 

Academic journals published by learned and professional societies
Animal welfare
English-language journals
Ethology journals
Publications established in 1992
Quarterly journals